Linnaea is a plant genus in the honeysuckle family Caprifoliaceae. Until 2013, the genus included a single species, Linnaea borealis. In 2013, on the basis of molecular phylogenetic evidence, the genus was expanded to include species formerly placed in Abelia (excluding section Zabelia), Diabelia, Dipelta, Kolkwitzia and Vesalea. However, this is rejected by the majority of subsequent scientific literature and flora.

Linnaea borealis was a favorite of Carl Linnaeus, founder of the modern system of binomial nomenclature, for whom the genus was named.

Taxonomy
The genus Linnaea was first formally described by Carl Linnaeus. The name had been used earlier by the Dutch botanist Jan Frederik Gronovius, and was given in honour of Linnaeus. Linnaeus adopted the name in 1753 in Species Plantarum for the then sole species Linnaea borealis, because it was his favourite plant.

Most botanists resisted placing other species in the genus, treating Linnaea as a monotypic genus. However, molecular phylogenetic studies from 2001 onwards showed that a number of genera were related to Linnaea (the "Linnaea clade"), although one of them, Abelia, was not monophyletic. In 2013, to maintain monophyletic genera, Maarten Christenhusz proposed merging Abelia (excluding section Zabelia), Diabelia, Dipelta, Kolkwitzia and Vesalea into Linnaea. This proposal has been adopted by some secondary sources, including briefly by Plants of the World Online (POWO). However, other sources prefer to maintain the segregation of Linnaeoideae into the traditional genera on grounds of morphology, biogeography and nomenclatural simplicity. POWO, in 2022 list Diabelia, and Vesalea as a separate species.
The World Flora Online (WFO), which now supersedes The Plant List (TPL), maintains Abelia as the accepted genus for example of Abelia × grandiflora, for which Linnaea × grandiflora is not listed as a synonym.

Former species
Not accepted by POWO, or WFO.

 Kolkwitzia amabilis  - Linnaea amabilis  – China (Anhui, Gansu, Henan, Hubei, Shaanxi, Shanxi); rare in the wild but widely cultivated in China, Japan, Europe and North America
 Linnaea borealis  – circumboreal and subarctic (Canada, northern and central USA, Greenland, northern Britain, Fennoscandia, Baltic States, Mainland Europe south to the Alps, and the Balkans, Ukraine, Russia, Siberia, Kazakhstan, Mongolia, northern China, Korea, northern Japan)
 Linnaea chinensis  – China (Fujian, Guangdong, Guangxi, Guizhou, Hubei, Hunan, Jiangxi, Sichuan, Yunnan, Zhejiang), northern Vietnam, Taiwan; commonly cultivated in China and Japan, occasionally in Europe and North America
 Linnaea coriacea  – Mexico (Nuevo León, San Luis Potosí)
 Linnaea dipelta  – China (Gansu, Guangxi, Hubei, Hunan, Shaanxi, Sichuan)
 Linnaea elegans  – China (Gansu, Sichuan)
 Linnaea engleriana 
 Linnaea floribunda  – Mexico (Chiapas, Oaxaca, Puebla, Veracruz)
 Linnaea forrestii  – south-central China (southwestern Sichuan, northwestern Yunnan)
 Linnaea × grandiflora  – garden hybrid of L. chinensis and L. uniflora, only known from cultivation
 Linnaea grandifolia  – Central Mexico (Querétaro)
 Linnaea macrotera 
 Linnaea mexicana  – south-central Mexico (Oaxaca)
 Linnaea occidentalis  – Mexico (Durango)
 Linnaea parvifolia 
 Linnaea serrata  – China (Zhejiang), Japan (Honshu, Kyushu, Shikoku)
 Linnaea spathulata  – China (Zhejiang), Japan (Honshu, Kyushu, Shikoku)
 Linnaea tetrasepala  – Japan (Honshu, Shikoku)
 Linnaea uniflora  – China (Fujian, Gansu, Guangxi, Guizhou, Henan, Hubei, Hunan, Shaanxi, Sichuan, Yunnan); frequently cultivated
 Linnaea yunnanensis  – China (Gansu, Guizhou, Hubei, Shaanxi, Sichuan, Yunnan), and adjacent Burma

Cultivation
Several species of Linnaea are in cultivation. In the UK, plants are widely listed under the name Abelia. Though not fully hardy, they are easy to grow in a sheltered, sunny position. The cultivar ‘Edward Goucher’ has gained the Royal Horticultural Society’s Award of Garden Merit.

References

External links
 
 

Caprifoliaceae